Bradley Barcola (born 2 September 2002) is a French professional footballer who plays as a forward for  club Lyon.

Early life 
Bradley Barcola was born in Villeurbanne, in a family with Togolese origins. He started playing football in his home town, in Lyon's suburb, before joining Olympique Lyonnais as an 8 years old.

Club career 
During the 2020–21 season Barcola started playing with the Lyon reserve in National 2 while also being a prolific goalscorer with the under-19 who played in the UEFA Youth League, before signing a junior contract in January 2021.

After being called up to Olympique Lyonnais first team by Peter Bosz during the 2021–22 pre-season—scoring his first goal against Bourg-en-Bresse— Barcola signed his first professional contract in September 2021, tying him to the club until 2024.

He made his professional debut for Lyon on 4 November 2021, replacing Rayan Cherki at the 81st minute of a 3–0 home win against Sparta Prague in the group stage of the Europa League. He managed to deliver an assist for Karl Toko Ekambi on Lyon third goal, helping his side to a win that would make them the first team to officially qualify for this edition round of 16.

On 1 February 2022, Barcola played his first Ligue 1 game as a late substitute for Malo Gusto during a 2–1 win against Marseille.

Barcola started on the pitch for the first time against Olympique de Marseille, with the game ending with a 3–0 away win for Lyon at Stade Velodrome.

International career 
Barcola was first selected with France under-18 in January 2020 to play two friendlies. However, he did not earn an official cap as most junior encounters were cancelled due to COVID-19 during the following seasons.

Style of play 
Barcola is a versatile forward, able to play on both sides of a front three or as a center forward. Fast and precise in front of the goal, he takes inspiration from players such as Pierre-Emerick Aubameyang.

Personal life 
Barcola's brother Malcolm is also a professional footballer playing for Tuzla City, he also plays internationally with the Togolese selection.

Career statistics

Notes

References

External links 
 Profile at the Olympique Lyonnais website
 

2002 births
Living people
People from Villeurbanne
Sportspeople from Lyon Metropolis
French sportspeople of Togolese descent
French footballers
Footballers from Auvergne-Rhône-Alpes
Association football forwards
Ligue 1 players
Championnat National 2 players
Olympique Lyonnais players